Xuefu Subdistrict is a subdistrict located in the eastern portion of Nankai District, Tianjin, China. It borders Wanxing Subdistrict in the north, Nanyingmen and Xinxing Subdistricts in the east, Machang Subdistrict in the southeast, Shuishanggongyuan Subdistrict in the south, as well as Wangdingdi and Jialing Avenue Subdistricts in the west. In 2010, its total population was 103,319.

This subdistrict was created in 1989 from the former Balitai and part of Xingyeli Subdistricts. It is named Xuefu for the famous Tianjin University and Nankai University within the subdistrict.

Geography 
Xuefu subdistrict is bounded by Jin River on the west, Fukang River on the south, and Weijin River on the east.

Administrative divisions 
In 2021, Xuefu Subdistrict was subdivided into 14 residential communities. They can be seen in the following table:

Gallery

References 

Township-level divisions of Tianjin
Nankai District, Tianjin